Sir Christopher Wymondham Raynor Herbert Cook, 5th Baronet (born 24 March 1938) is the current holder of the Cook Baronetcy and Visconde de Monserrate (Viscount of Monserrate), having inherited the titles from his father Sir Francis Cook in 1978. His mother was the former Joan Loraine Case.

Life
He was educated at the King's School, Canterbury, and served as an officer in the Royal Air Force. He served as a director of Diamond Guarantees between 1980 and 1991 and now lives on Guernsey.

Marriages and issue
Malina Pereira, daughter of Edwin and Lucy Pereira, in 1958 (divorced 1975), having
Richard Herbert Aster Maurice Cook b. 30 Jun 1959
Priscilla Melina Cook b. Oct 1969
Margaret Murray, daughter of John Murray, in 1975, having
Caroline Emma Cook b. 1978
Alexander James Frederick Cook b. 1980

External links
http://thepeerage.com/p25100.htm#i250994

1938 births
Living people
Baronets in the Baronetage of the United Kingdom
English businesspeople
Royal Air Force officers
People educated at The King's School, Canterbury